The Houston Intermodal Transit Center (also known as Burnett Plaza)  was a planned hub for local, commuter, and intercity transit in Houston (Texas, USA). The site is located adjacent to the campus of the University of Houston–Downtown (UHD). The center would have eventually replaced the Houston Amtrak station, as well as various bus terminals throughout the city such as Greyhound Lines.

Design
The transit center was designed by EE&K. The plan for the structure would have been a modern glass and steel building surrounding a "great space". Because the facility would have been built over the tracks, one of the dominant features would have been a grand staircase. The center was designed as a multi-level station with heavy rail (commuter, Amtrak, Union Pacific freight) running under a large public space with light rail running via an elevated structure. Main Street would have been split into Upper Main Street, with access to the station at the level of the public space in a loop, and Lower Main Street, which would have gone underneath the entire station and continued on as North Main Street.

Cancellation
Following METRO's 2010 annual audit, the agency decided to cancel the project as part of a US$168 million write-down of worthless or non-existent assets. The value of the land US$21 million was to be recorded separately as a remaining asset.

A smaller light rail station and bus terminal, named Burnett Transit Center, opened in 2013 on the southeast corner of Main and Burnett.

References

METRORail stations
Unbuilt buildings and structures in the United States